Llama Llama is a children's animated web television series that premiered on January 26, 2018, on Netflix. Co-produced by Genius Brands and Telegael Teoranta and based on the books by Anna Dewdney, the series follows an anthropomorphic llama named Llama Llama (voiced by Shayle Simons) living with his Mama Llama (voiced by Jennifer Garner) in a town that is run by anthropomorphic animals where he learns about fun, friendship and new things. The series was produced by Reed Duncan, Dewdney's longtime partner, doing so in tribute to her. The series had been renewed for a second season, which was released on November 15, 2019.

Cast and characters
 Shayle Simons as Llama Llama, the protagonist.  A playful llama who loves to have fun.
 Jennifer Garner as Mama Llama, Llama's mama.
 Alistair Abell as Billy Goat, Gilroy's brother whose appearance slightly resembles Euclid.
 Austin Abell as Gilroy Goat, an ornery goat who doesn't like being a fair sport.
 Vania Gill as Luna Giraffe, an upbeat giraffe with a gentle voice who loves art.
 Islie Hirvonen as Nelly Gnu, a sassy gnu who loves to paint, but commonly riding her skateboard.
 Evans Johnson as Zelda Zebra, a zebra who is Llama's teacher, her husband is a horse named Happy and has two horse children.
 Grady Ainscough as Roland Rhino,  a rhinoceros.
 Grady Ainscough as Harold Hackney, a horse who is one of Zelda Zebra's children.
 Kathleen Barr as Grandma Llama, Llama's grandmother who has a slight British accent.
 David Orth/David Poole as Grandpa Llama, Llama's grandfather, he speaks with an Irish accent.
 Brenden Sunderland as Euclid Sheep, a sheep who likes math/science.
 Vincent Tong as Officer Flamingo, a police flamingo.
 Mei Onischak as Audrey Antelope, an antelope with disabilities.
 Vincent Tong as Daddy Gnu, Nelly's father who hires a bakery.
 Kathleen Barr as Mama Gnu, Nelly's mother.
 Kathleen Barr as Lenora Leopard, a leopard who works as a librarian and a musician.
 Kathleen Barr/Franciska Friede as Ramona Rhino, Roland's sister.
 Franciska Friede as Hilda Hackney, a pony with a somewhat English accent and is Zelda's daughter.  Her last name comes from Hackney London.
 Kathleen Barr as Eleanor Elephant, an elephant chef who speaks with a thick British accent.

Episodes

Season 1 (2018)

Season 2 (2019)
Season 2 was released on November 15, 2019. Although the order below reflects the order in which the episodes are listed on Netflix, Netflix's on-screen display carries the notation "Watch In Any Order".

Possible Season 3
The show was renewed for a third season in December 2019, although some screenshots of new episodes exist on certain websites, there has been no airing of it on Netflix or availability of the season elsewhere leading to the possibility it may be scrapped and abandoned. In December 2020, a 60 minute long Christmas episode titled "The Holiday Helper" was announced on British television but the episode has yet to be shown on British and American Netflix. The show has currently no season 3 episodes available and therefore the studio has no plans to release season 3 on home video formats or YouTube.

References

External links
 Official website
 

2010s American animated television series
2018 American television series debuts
2018 Irish television series debuts
2019 American television series endings
2019 Irish television series endings
American children's animated adventure television series
American children's animated fantasy television series
Irish children's animated adventure television series
Irish children's animated fantasy television series
American preschool education television series
Irish preschool education television series
Animated preschool education television series
2010s preschool education television series
American television shows based on children's books
Animated television series about mammals
English-language Netflix original programming
Fictional llamas
Netflix children's programming
Animated television series by Netflix
Television shows set in England